CCTV-5, also known as the Sports Channel, part of the China Central Television family of networks, is the main sports broadcaster in the People's Republic of China.  CCTV-5 began broadcasting on 1 January 1995. CCTV-5 now broadcasts 24 hours a day, 7 days a week.

Current sports coverage
CCTV-5 has coverage of the following sports leagues, teams, and events:

 Multi-sports games

 Asian Games
 Summer Olympic Games
 Summer Paralympic Games
 Winter Olympic Games
 Winter Paralympic Games

 Auto Racing
 Formula One

 Badminton

 BWF World Championships
 Badminton Asia Confederation
 China Open
 China Masters
 Chinese Badminton Association
 All England Open Badminton Championships
 Sudirman Cup
 Uber & Thomas Cup

 Basketball

 Chinese Basketball Association
 National Basketball Association
 FIBA Basketball World Cup

 Boxing
 World Boxing Association
 World Boxing Council
 International Boxing Federation
 World Boxing Organization

 Cycling
 Tour de France
 Tour of Qinghai Lake

 Field Hockey
 Hockey World Cup
 Women's Hockey World Cup
 Women's FIH Hockey World League

 Football
 Chinese Football Association
 Chinese Super League
 Chinese FA Cup
 Chinese FA Super Cup
 China National Football Team
 FIFA World Cup
 FIFA Confederations Cup
 FIFA Club World Cup
 FIFA U-20 World Cup
 FIFA U-17 World Cup
 FIFA Futsal World Cup
 FIFA Beach Soccer World Cup
 FIFA Women's World Cup
 FIFA U-20 Women's World Cup
 FIFA U-17 Women's World Cup
 AFC Asian Cup
 AFC U-23 Championship
 AFC U-19 Championship
 AFC U-16 Championship
 AFC Champions League
 UEFA Euro
 UEFA Champions League
 UEFA Super Cup
 Premier League
 Serie A
 Toulon Tournament
 Copa Libertadores

 Golf
 PGA Tour 
 Ryder Cup

 Handball
 IHF World Men's Handball Championship (CCTV5+)
 IHF World Women's Handball Championship (CCTV5+)

 Ice Hockey
 National Hockey League (CCTV5+)
 Kontinental Hockey League (CCTV5+)
 Ice Hockey World Championships (CCTV5+)
 World Cup of Hockey (CCTV5+)
 Champions Hockey League (CCTV5+)

 MMA
 Kunlun Fight MMA

 Rugby Union
 Rugby World Cup (CCTV5+)
 Premiership Rugby (CCTV5+)

 Snooker
 World Snooker Championship
 Shanghai Masters (snooker)
 China Open (snooker)
 UK Championship

 Surfing
 America's Cup

 Table Tennis
 World Table Tennis Championships
 Table Tennis World Cup
 ITTF World Tour
 Asian Table Tennis Championships
 China Table Tennis Super League

 Tennis
 All four Grand Slam
 Australian Open
 French Open
 Wimbledon Championships
 US Open
 ATP World Tour Masters 1000
 ATP World Tour Finals
 China Open
 WTA Shenzhen Open
 WTA Wuhan Open

Volleyball
 FIVB Volleyball Men's World Championship
 FIVB Volleyball Men's World Cup
 FIVB Volleyball Women's World Championship
 FIVB Volleyball Women's World Cup
 FIVB Volleyball Men's Nations League
 FIVB Volleyball Women's Nations League
 FIVB Volleyball Women's Club World Championship
 Asian Men's Volleyball Championship
 Asian Women's Volleyball Championship
 AVC Cup for Men
 AVC Cup for Women
 Chinese Volleyball Super League

Past coverage

 Asian Games
 Beijing Television (Old)
 Bangkok 1978 (simulcast of National Sports, broadcast via satellite)
 CCTV-2
 New Delhi 1982 (simulcast of DD Sports)
 Seoul 1986 (simulcast of KBS Sports 4)
 Beijing 1990 (simulcast of CCTV Asian Games)
 Hiroshima 1994 (simulcast of NHK Educational TV)
 CCTV-5
 Bangkok 1998 (simulcast of National Sports)
 Busan 2002 (simulcast of KBS Sports 4)
 Doha 2006 (simulcast of Al Jazeera Sports 6)
 Guangzhou 2010 (simulcast of GDTV Zhuhai Sports)
 Incheon 2014 (simulcast of KBS Sports 4)
 Jakarta 2018 (simulcast of Televisi Republik Indonesia)
 Summer Olympic Games
 Beijing Television (Old)
 Montreal 1976 (simulcast of CBFT-DT, broadcast in PAL Color)
 CCTV-2
 Moscow 1980 (simulcast of CT-USSR, via satellite)
 Los Angeles 1984 (simulcast of Olympics on NBC, first Olympic Games for the PRC)
 Seoul 1988 (simulcast of KBS Sports 4)
 Barcelona 1992 (simulcast of TVE)
 CCTV-5
 Atlanta 1996 (simulcast of Olympics on NBC)
 Past Coverage As CCTV-Olympic (Name and logo changed)
Sydney 2000 (simulcast of C7 Sport)
Athens 2004 (simulcast of CCTV-1, CCTV-2, CCTV-5 and CCTV-News)
Beijing 2008 (simulcast of CCTV-1, CCTV-2, CCTV-3, CCTV-5, CCTV-7, CCTV-12, CCTV-News and CCTV-HD)
London 2012 (simulcast of CCTV-1, CCTV-5, CCTV-7, CCTV-News and CCTV-HD)
Rio 2016 (simulcast of CCTV-1, CCTV-5, CCTV-5+ and CCTV-News)
 Tokyo 2020 (simulcast of CCTV-1, CCTV-5, CCTV-5+ and CCTV-News)
 Winter Olympic Games
 Beijing Television (Old)
 Innsbruck 1976 (simulcast of FS1, first color broadcast)
 Lake Placid 1980 (simulcast of Olympics on ABC)
 CCTV-2
 Sarajevo 1984 (simulcast of JRT)
 Calgary 1988 (simulcast of CFCN-DT)
 Albertville 1992 (simulcast on TF1, Antenne 2 and FR3)
 Lillehammer 1994 (simulcast of NRK)
 CCTV-5
 Nagano 1998 (simulcast of NHK, NTV, TBS, Fuji TV, TV Asahi and TV Tokyo)
 Salt Lake City 2002 (simulcast of Olympics on NBC)
 Torino 2006 (simulcast of CCTV-1, CCTV-2, CCTV-5 and CCTV-News)
 Vancouver 2010 (simulcast of CCTV-1, CCTV-5, CCTV-7, CCTV-News and CCTV-HD)
 Sochi 2014 (simulcast of CCTV-1, CCTV-5, CCTV-5+ and CCTV-News)
 Pyeongchang 2018 (simulcast of CCTV-1, CCTV-5, CCTV-5+ and CCTV-News)
 Beijing 2022 (simulcast of CCTV-1, CCTV-5, CCTV-5+ and CCTV-News)

Past coverage as CCTV-FIFA World Cup

 FIFA World Cup
 CCTV-2
 Spain 1982 (all matches live on CCTV-1)
 Mexico 1986 (all matches live on CCTV-1)
 Italy 1990 (all matches live on CCTV-1)
 United States 1994 (all matches live on CCTV-1 and CCTV-2)
 CCTV-5
 France 1998 (all matches live on CCTV-1, CCTV-2 and CCTV-7)
 Korea & Japan 2002 (all matches live on CCTV-1, CCTV-2 and CCTV-7)
 Germany 2006 (all matches live on CCTV-1, CCTV-2 and CCTV-7)
 South Africa 2010 (all matches live on CCTV-1, CCTV-2 and CCTV-7)
 Brazil 2014 (all matches live on CCTV-1, CCTV-2, CCTV-7, CCTV-13 and CCTV-22)
 Russia 2018 (all matches live on CCTV-1, CCTV-2, CCTV-7, CCTV-13 and CCTV-22)
 Qatar 2022 (all matches live on CCTV-1, CCTV-2, CCTV-7, CCTV-13 and CCTV-22)

Past coverage as CCTV-UEFA Euro
 UEFA European Championship
 CCTV-1
 West Germany 1988 (all matches live on CCTV-1)
 Sweden 1992 (all matches live on CCTV-1)
 England 1996  (all matches live on CCTV-1, CCTV-2 and CCTV-7)
 Belgium/Netherlands 2000  (all matches live on CCTV-1, CCTV-2 and CCTV-7)
 Portugal 2004 (all matches live on CCTV-1, CCTV-2, CCTV-7 and CCTV-13)
 Austria/Switzerland 2008 (all matches live on CCTV-1, CCTV-2, CCTV-7, CCTV-13 and CCTV-HD)
 Poland/Ukraine 2012 (all matches live on CCTV-1, CCTV-2, CCTV-7, CCTV-13 and CCTV-22)
 France 2016 (all matches live on CCTV-1, CCTV-2, CCTV-7, CCTV-13 and CCTV-22)
 Europe 2020 (all matches live on CCTV-1, CCTV-2, CCTV-7, CCTV-13 and CCTV-22)

Programmes 
 Who is the [Dance] King? [谁是舞王]
 Sports News [体育咖吧]
 Wushu Masters [武林大会]
 Chinese Longzhou Tournament [中华龙舟大赛]
 Who is the [Football] King? [谁是球王]

See also
 Beijing Tiyu Guangbo - Beijing Sports Radio

References

External links
 

China Central Television channels
Sports television networks
Television channels and stations established in 1995
1995 establishments in China